Events from the year 1562 in art.

Events
 In Venice, sumptuary laws decree that all gondolas must be painted black to prevent lavish displays of wealth.
 Giorgio Vasari, who had begun work on the Uffizi in Florence in 1560, founds the Academy of Design.
 Paolo Veronese begins painting The Wedding at Cana (1562-1563).
 The Medici court astronomer Fra Ignazio Danti paints maps at the Palazzo Vecchio.
 Tintoretto begins the three paintings of the miracles of St. Mark (1562–66) for the Scuola di San Marco.
 Flemish artist Hieronymus Cock and Spanish cartographer Diego Gutiérrez produce the map Americae Sive Quartae Orbis Partis Nova Et Exactissima Descriptio.

Paintings

 Pieter Brueghel the Elder paints The Triumph of Death and Dull Gret, both strongly influenced by the style of Hieronymus Bosch.
 Frans Floris paints The Sacrifice of Jesus Christ, Son of God, Gathering and Protecting Mankind (Allegory of the Trinity).
 Lattanzio Gambara paints frescos.
 Titian paints The Death of Actaeon (National Gallery, London; approximate date) and The Rape of Europa (Isabella Stewart Gardner Museum, Boston).
 Ludger Tom Ring the Younger paints a pair of upright pictures of iris and lilies.

Births
May 6 - Pietro Bernini, Italian sculptor and father of the more famous Gianlorenzo Bernini (died 1629)
 date unknown
Fabrizio Castello, Italian painter of Genoese origin settled in Spain (died 1617)
Jerónimo Rodriguez de Espinosa, Spanish painter of the Renaissance period (died 1630)
Pietro Faccini, Italian painter in styles bridging Mannerism and the nascent Baroque (died 1602/1614)
Cornelis van Haarlem, Dutch painter and draughtsman, was one of the leading Mannerist artists in The Netherlands (died 1638)
Hendrick Cornelisz Vroom, Dutch painter (died 1640), father of reverse-named painter Cornelis Hendriksz Vroom (1591-1661)

Deaths
August 1 - Virgil Solis, German draughtsman and printmaker in engraving, etching and woodcut (born 1514)
November 11 - Francesco de' Rossi ("Il Salviati"), Florentine Mannerist painter (born 1510)
December 6 - Jan van Scorel, Dutch painter credited with the introduction of High Italian Renaissance art to the Netherlands (born 1495)
date unknown
Francesco del Prato, Italian still-life painter and goldsmith (born unknown)
Jean Duvet, French Renaissance goldsmith and engraver (born 1485)
Francesco Torbido, Italian painter (born 1486)

 
Years of the 16th century in art